Else Rambausek (married name Else Rambausek-Salzer; 2 December 1907 in Purkersdorf, Austria – 14 August 1994 in Vienna, Austria) was an Austrian actress and singer.

Career
She graduated from the University of Music and Performing Arts, Vienna. She appeared at various theaters with Walter Bruno Iltz and also revue theaters, particularly in Viennese operettas and musical comedies. They made their names as singers, particularly as interpreters of Viennese songs. In 1945, at the Raimund Theater, when the musical comedy Das Dreimäderlhaus was revived, the pair were among the performers.
 
Rambusek appeared at the Löwinger-Bühne and in 1959 at the Lake Festival Mörbisch as Princess Bocena in the operetta Countess Maritza. She also acted in theater productions such as the 1964 production of The Threepenny Opera at the Theater an der Wien as Celia Peachum. She also worked in radio.
 
After 1951, she took on supporting roles in movies, including musicals and comedies. In these roles she usually played silly housekeepers or stern aunts. Rambausek was married to Karl Salzer.

Death

Else Rambausek is buried in the cemetery in Purkersdorf.

Filmography

References

External links
 
 

1907 births
1994 deaths
Austrian stage actresses
Austrian film actresses
20th-century Austrian women singers
People from Wien-Umgebung District
20th-century Austrian actresses